Breadth of market is an indicator used in security analysis. In its simplest form it is computed on a stock market by taking the ratio of the number of advancing stocks to declining stocks.

Bibliography
 The complete guide to market breadth indicators by Gregory L. Morris 2005

References

Technical analysis